Environmental Charter High School, abbreviated to ECHS,  is a 9th through 12th grade public charter high school in Lawndale, California. It was founded in 2002.

Prior to its founding, there was another high school at the same location that was named “Victory”. 
It was around from at least 1999-2001.

History 
Environmental Charter High School was founded in 2002 by a group of parents, educators, businesses and non-profits. It is the second school in a network of Environmental Charter Schools in South Los Angeles.
It was formerly known as “Victory” high school during the 90’s.

Location 
Environmental Charter High School is located off of Hawthorne Blvd in Lawndale, California.  It is located near William Green Park, El Camino College, and walking distance from South Bay Galleria.

Demographics 
For the 2015-2016 school year, Environmental Charter High School has 500 registered students.

Diversity:
Hispanic: 68%
African-American: 20%
Asian: 6%
Caucasian: 4%
Other: 2%

Academics 
Environmental Charter High School focuses on preparing students to continue on to a four-year university by designing student's schedules to align with University of California's A-G requirements.

A variety of enrichment and advanced placement classes are offered in Environmental Charter High School including:
European History
United States History
Environmental Science
Spanish
Calculus

To build college readiness efforts, Environmental Charter High School offers SAT and ACT preparation as part of the course curriculum. To ensure students are prepared for the SAT, all of students take the PSAT in 9th, 10th, and 11th grades and the PACT in 10th and 11th grade. In order to graduate, all seniors are expected to apply and gain acceptance into a four-year university.

Partnerships 
Environmental Charter High School partners with companies and non-profits in the community such as:
College Match
POSSEE Foundation
AAA Flag & Banner
Boeing
Media Policy Center
The Ahmanson Foundation
Kaboom!
LISC Los Angeles
Steinmetz Family Foundation
Chevron
Manatt
California Community Foundation
State Farm Insurance
Weingart Foundation
Walton Family Foundation

Athletics 
Environmental Charter High School offers a variety of sports including soccer, basketball, baseball, and softball.

Soccer 
The men's varsity soccer team, coached by Jose Juarez, has an overall record of 8-10 in the 2015-2016 season. The women's varsity soccer team, coached by Miguel Gamez, has an overall record of 2-11-1 in the 2015-2016 season.

Basketball 
The men's varsity basketball team, coached by Owen Thomas, has an overall record of 12-9 in the 2015-2016 season. The men's junior varsity team, coached by Eric Contreras, has an overall record of 6-5 in the 2015-2016 season. The women's varsity basketball team, coached by Phillip Yates, has an overall record of 11-5 in the 2015-2016 season.

Baseball 
The men's varsity baseball team, coached by Alex Serrano and Jose Juarez, has an overall record of 1-6-1 in the 2016 season.

Softball 
The women's varsity softball team, coached by Brandie Cobb, has an overall record of 3-5 in the 2016 season.

Outdoor education 
In addition to the academic curriculum, all grade level students participate in an extended learning outdoor education trip each year. Each grade level has different trips, and each grade level has a difficulty level. Starting in 9th grade toward 12th grade, outdoor ed starts to get harder from Catalina to a very challenging trip that involves the LA tour.

References

External links
 

High schools in Los Angeles County, California
Lawndale, California
Charter high schools in California
2000 establishments in California